Jalandhar West Assembly constituency is one of the 117 Legislative Assembly constituencies of Punjab state in India.
It is part of Jalandhar district and is reserved for candidates belonging to the Scheduled Castes.

Members of the Legislative Assembly

Election results

2022

2017

See also
 List of constituencies of the Punjab Legislative Assembly
 Jalandhar district

References

External links
 

Assembly constituencies of Punjab, India
Jalandhar district